The 2012 Dayton Dutch Lions season was the club's third season of existence, as well as their second season of playing professional soccer. The Dutch Lions played in the USL Professional Division, the third-tier of American soccer.

Outside the USL Pro the Dutch Lions entered the U.S. Open Cup in the second round proper of the tournament.

Background

Review

Competitions

USL Pro

Standings

U.S. Open Cup

Statistics

Appearances and goals

Transfers

In

Out

Loan in

Loan out

References 

Dayton Dutch Lions
2012
American soccer clubs 2012 season
2012 in sports in Ohio